Montano orthohantavirus, also called Montano virus (MTNV) is a single-stranded, enveloped, negative sense RNA species of hantavirus. It was first isolated in Mexican wild rodents located in Morelos and Guerrero, Mexico.

References

Hantaviridae